The prime minister of the Republic of Yemen is the head of government of Yemen.

Under the Constitution of Yemen, the prime minister is appointed by the president, and the former, as well as their Cabinet, must enjoy confidence from the House of Representatives.

The current prime minister of Yemen is Maeen Abdulmalik Saeed. He took office on 18 October 2018, after President Abdrabbuh Mansur Hadi removed his predecessor, pro-Houthi Ahmed Obeid bin Dagher, from office.

See also
Cabinet of Yemen
Prime Minister of Yemen Arab Republic (North Yemen)
List of heads of government of Yemen
List of leaders of South Yemen

References

External links
World Statesmen - Yemen

 
Prime minister
Prime minister
Prime minister
Prime Minister